The Bear Creek Fishweir #1 is a historic fishing weir on Bear Creek in Tishomingo State Park, in northeastern Mississippi. The two dams formed a V shape with a narrow chute between them. At that point there is evidence of a 20th-century fish trap constructed of wooden elements, of which only fragments remained. Its known history is that it was built (or more likely, rebuilt) by William Wiley Leatherwood, whose family maintained the weir. State law requiring weirs to not impede waterflow was passed in the 1920s, leading to its decreased effectiveness and eventual abandonment. The weir is one of the best-preserved such structures in northeastern Mississippi, many of the others having been destroyed to improve water flow.

The weir wa listed on the National Register of Historic Places in 2005.

See also
 Bear Creek Fishweir No. 2
 National Register of Historic Places listings in Tishomingo County, Mississippi

References

		
National Register of Historic Places in Tishomingo County, Mississippi
Archaeological sites on the National Register of Historic Places in Mississippi
Weirs